Abrarul Haq Haqqi (20 December 1920 — 17 May 2006) was an Indian Sunni Muslim scholar who established Ashraful Madaris in Hardoi. He was a disciple of Ashraf Ali Thanwi.

Biography
Haqqi was born on 20 December 1920 in Hardoi. He graduated from Mazahir Uloom Saharanpur.

Haqqi was appointed a teacher in Mazahir Uloom Saharanpur after his graduation. He later taught at Jami-ul-Uloom Kanpur, a seminary in Kanpur, for two years. At Ashraf Ali Thanwi's suggestion, he taught at Madrasa Islamia Fatehpur for two years. In 1942, he established Ashraful Madaris in Hardoi at the suggestion of Ashraf Ali Thanwi. Since, he was a Sufi mentor, he authorized 103 disciples.

Haqqi died on 17 May 2006.

Legacy
At Aligarh Muslim University (AMU), Ateequr Rahman Qasmi wrote a doctoral thesis entitled Maulana Abrarul Haq: Life and Works. His brother Syed Anwarul Haq Haqqi headed the Political Science department of AMU for two decades.

References 

Indian Sunni Muslim scholars of Islam
1920 births
2005 deaths
Deobandis
20th-century Muslim scholars of Islam
People from British India
People from Hardoi district
Mazahir Uloom alumni
Disciples of Ashraf Ali Thanwi